Ricaut Bonomel (En Ricatz Honomel in one chansonnier) was a Knight Templar and troubadour in the Holy Land around the time of the Eighth Crusade. He was an outspoken critic of Charles I of Naples and his attempts to secure a throne in Italy, and of the Papal policy which diverted funds intended for the Holy Land to other purposes. He was also a vocal critic of the European clergy who did not preach crusading.

Bonomel's dispute was not so much with the Italian crusades in general, but with the siphoning off of monies paid for the commuting of crusader vows to fund Angevin ambitions in Italy when they should have been going to the Holy Land. His sole surviving song, Ir'e dolors s'es dins mon cor asseza, a sirventes, is a contrafactum of a canso by Peirol, M'entencio ai tot'en un vers mesa. Ricaut demonstrates a skilled portrayal of the emotions of frustration and anger. He employs reverse psychology in an effort to stoke fervour for crusading: the Holy Land is lost, Christianity is defeated, God is on the side of the pagans. It is a conscious play on the assumption implicit in many chansons de geste that divine approval is indicated by success on the battlefield. 

The poem can be dated to between the capture of the Hospitaller castle of Arsuf to Baibars on 29 April 1265 and that of the Templar fortress at Saphet in late July 1266.

Notes

Sources

Puckett, Jaye. "Reconmenciez novele estoire: The Troubadours and the Rhetoric of the Later Crusades." MLN, Vol. 116, No. 4, French Issue. (Sep., 2001), pp. 844–889.
Throop, Palmer A. "Criticism of Papal Crusade Policy in Old French and Provençal." Speculum, Vol. 13, No. 4. (Oct., 1938), pp. 379–412.

External links
Ricaut Bonomel, Ir'e dolors s'es dins mon cor asseza, translated by Helen Nicholson, at The ORB: On-Line Reference Book for Medieval Studies.

Medieval Knights Templar members
13th-century Italian troubadours
Year of death unknown
Year of birth unknown